Radu Cristian Ghiță (born 22 November 1990) is a Romanian handballer who plays as a right back for AHC Potaissa Turda and the Romania national team.

Achievements
Liga Națională:
Silver Medalist: 2012, 2013, 2014, 2020
Bronze Medalist: 2018, 2019, 
Cupa României:
Finalist: 2012, 2013, 2014
Supercupa României:
Finalist: 2013
EHF Challenge Cup:
Winner: 2018
Semifinalist: 2011

References

1990 births
Living people
Sportspeople from Bacău
Romanian male handball players
Romanian expatriates in France
Expatriate handball players